William Field Lloyd (1873 – 29 May 1965) was a school teacher and member of the Queensland Legislative Assembly.

Biography
Lloyd was born at Tenby, Wales, to parents David Lloyd and his wife Elizabeth (née Field). He came to Australia at an early age and was educated at Brisbane State School. He started out his working life as an apprentice printer but before long he found himself working as a school teacher at Charters Towers Normal School and Ithaca Creek State School. He then established and directed the Queensland Correspondence College.

On 8 December 1926 he married Mabel Stack (died 1978) at St Columb's Church of England, Clayfield and together had one son. He died in May 1965 and was cremated at Mount Thompson Crematorium.

Political career
Lloyd, for the Labor Party won the seat of Enoggera at the 1915 Queensland state election after being defeated at the 1911 by-election and the 1912 state election. He was defeated in 1920 by James Kerr of the National Party.

In 1923, Lloyd won the new seat of Kelvin Grove and held it for six years before being defeated by the CPNP's Richard Hill.

References

Members of the Queensland Legislative Assembly
1873 births
1965 deaths